Maurice Gillis (6 November 1897 – 22 March 1980) was a Belgian international footballer who played as a striker.

Career
Gillis played for Standard Liège, and scored 8 goals in 23 appearances for the Belgian national side, including at the 1924 Summer Olympics.

References

1897 births
1980 deaths
Footballers from Liège
Belgian footballers
Belgium international footballers
Standard Liège players
Olympic footballers of Belgium
Footballers at the 1924 Summer Olympics
Association football forwards